Trefeglwys is a village and community in Powys, Wales, within the  historic county of Montgomeryshire.

The name derives from the Welsh language tref 'township' and eglwys 'church'.  The village sits on the Afon Trannon. There are many amenities in the village including public house, garage, parish church, Nonconformist chapel, primary school, village hall and children's playground.

The community includes the settlements of Llawryglyn and Staylittle.

Historical context 
Historically, the parish of Trefeglwys includes the townships of Bodaioch, Maestrefgomer, Esgeirieth and Dolgwden.

Notable people 
 John Breynton (1719–1799), chaplain in the Royal Navy, minister in Halifax, Nova Scotia, Canada.
 Nicholas Bennett (1823–1899), historian and musician, born in Glanrafon
 Maldwyn Jones Griffith OBE (1940-2020), consultant orthopaedic surgeon 
 Phil Mills (born 1963), is a Welsh rally racing co-driver.
 David Higgins (born 1972), 2012 Rally America Champion Driver, lives in Trefeglwys

References

External links 
Trefeglwys - A One Parish Study
Trefeglwys Community Council - Key Statistics, Powys Council Council Research and Information Unit
www.geograph.co.uk : photos of Trefeglwys and surrounding area

Historic Montgomeryshire Parishes
Villages in Powys